Hiram W. Webster (born 10 January 1824) was a political figure in the U.S. state of Wisconsin in the latter part of the nineteenth century. He was a Republican member of the Wisconsin State Assembly in 1879 and 1880. Webster was born in New York. He was married to Betsey J. Webster (born 1828 in Vermont).

References

People from Winnebago County, Wisconsin
Republican Party members of the Wisconsin State Assembly
1824 births
Year of death missing